DFDS Seaways France, trading as DFDS Seaways, and formerly known as New Channel Company A/S, is the trading name of the ferry services across the Dover Strait and English Channel operated by DFDS Seaways and formerly operated by LD Lines.

History 
In 2012 when SeaFrance was liquidated, DFDS and LD Lines started a joint service between Dover and Calais and formed New Channel Company A/S or DFDS Seaways France by merging certain LD Lines and DFDS routes into the new company such as LD Lines Portsmouth to Le Havre and Newhaven to Dieppe services and DFDS Dover to Dunkirk services but also along with the joint Dover- Calais service.

In June 2015, DFDS chartered the MyFerryLink/Eurotunnel ferries MS Rodin & MS Berlioz to enter service on 2 July 2015 when the MyFerryLink Dover-Calais ceased service. DFDS planned to keep 202 of the 600 French jobs currently employed by SCOP Seafrance, but in reaction to this decision, the French crew struck in Calais on 29 June 2015 and later occupied the two passenger vessels in Calais and started to vandalise the vessels. This delayed their re-entry into Dover-Calais service. Meanwhile, MS Calais Seaways was diverted and placed on Dover-Dunkirk service and MS Malo Seaways was laid up in Dover from 29 June. On 13 September both vessels were tugged to Dunkirk for refit and repaint, which showed the start of DFDS ownership of the vessels, which have subsequently been renamed Côte des Dunes and Côte des Flandres.

In October 2014, DFDS extended its operation contract for the Newhaven-Dieppe service with Syndicat Mixte de Promotion de L'Activité Transmanche (SMPAT), for a further year to secure the service, and was further extended in May 2016 for four years until May 2020.

On 31 December 2014, DFDS closed the Portsmouth-Le Havre service due to continued losses on the service, following its acquisition from LD Lines and also following Brittany Ferries introduction of its Economie service to Le Havre. The sole vessel, MS Seven Sisters was moved to lay up in Dunkirk before being introduced during the summer of 2015 full-time on the Newhaven-Dieppe service.

As of August 2017, DFDS Seaways currently operates between Dover and Calais/Dunkirk and also Newhaven and Dieppe.

Fleet

Former fleet

References

DFDS